The 1995–96 Czech Cup was the third season of the annual football knock-out tournament of the Czech Republic. Winners Sparta Prague qualified for the 1996–97 UEFA Cup Winners' Cup.

Preliminary round

Round 1

Round 2

Round 3

Round 4

|}

Quarterfinals

|}

Semifinals
The semifinals were played on 15 May 1996.

|}

Final

See also
 1995–96 Czech First League
 1995–96 Czech 2. Liga

References

External links
 Official site 
 Czech Cup 1995/96 at RSSSF.com

1995–96
1995–96 domestic association football cups
Cup